Munderga is a panchayat village in the southern state of Karnataka, India. Administratively, Munderga is under Yadgir Taluka of Yadgir District in Karnataka.  The village of Munderga is 6 km by road west of the village of Ramasamudra, and 5 km by road east of the town of Yadgir.  The nearest railhead is in Yadgir.

There are four villages in the gram panchayat: Munderga, Ashoknagar, Belgera, and Kurkumbal.

Demographics 
 census, the village of Munderga had 3,150 inhabitants, with 1,642 males and 1,508 females.

Notes

External links 
 

Villages in Yadgir district